Maloye Pozharovo is a rural locality (a village) in Yenangskoye Rural Settlement, Kichmengsko-Gorodetsky District, Vologda Oblast, Russia. The population was 36 as of 2002.

Geography 
Maloye Pozharovo is located 81 km southeast of Kichmengsky Gorodok (the district's administrative centre) by road. Mokrushino is the nearest rural locality.

References 

Rural localities in Kichmengsko-Gorodetsky District